Macrozamia douglasii is a species of plant in the family Zamiaceae. It is endemic to Queensland, Australia.

References

douglasii
Least concern flora of Australia
Flora of Queensland
Least concern biota of Queensland
Taxonomy articles created by Polbot